The 1996 Oceania Athletics Championships were held in Townsville, Australia, between November 28–30, 1996.

A total of 42 events were contested, 22 by men and 20 by women.

Medal summary
Medal winners were published.  Complete results can be found as compiled by Bob Snow from Athletics PNG.

Men

Women

Medal table (unofficial)

Participation (unofficial)
The participation of athletes from 16 countries was reported by the Pacific Islands Athletics Statistics publication.

 
 
 
 
 
 
 
 
 
 
 
 
 
/

References

Oceania Athletics Championships
International athletics competitions hosted by Australia
Oceanian Championships
1996 in Australian sport
November 1996 sports events in Australia